Boozer is a surname. Notable people with the surname include:

 Allen Boozer (born 1944), American physicist
 Bob Boozer (1937–2012), American former professional basketball player
 Brenda Boozer (born 1948), is American singer
 Carlos Boozer (born 1981), professional basketball player
 Don Boozer (fl. 2007), American constructed language creator
 Emerson Boozer (born 1943), professional American football player
 John Boozer (1938–1986), American baseball player
 Margaret Boozer (born 1966), American ceramist and sculptor
 F. Vernon Boozer (born 1936), former American politician
 Mel Boozer (1946–1987), American politician
 Young Boozer (born 1948), American politician